Roy Thomas Thurnham (born 17 December 1942) is an English former professional footballer who played as a defender. He made appearances in the English Football League for Wrexham.

References

1942 births
Living people
English footballers
Association football defenders
Manchester City F.C. players
Wrexham A.F.C. players
Caroline Springs George Cross FC players
English Football League players
Sportspeople from Macclesfield